Scarcity Of Tanks is an experimental rock band. 

Founded in 2004, in Cleveland, Ohio Matthew Wascovich is the only member to be in every iteration of the band which has long had a revolving lineup. 

Author Jonathan Lethem penned the liner notes for their 2018 album Hinge.

Discography
No Endowments (Textile, 2003)
Bleed Now (Total Life Society, 2010)
Sensational Grade (Total Life Society, 2011)
Vulgar Defender (Total Life Society, 2012)
Fear is Not Conscience (Total Life Society, 2012)
Ringleader Lies (Total Life Society, 2016)
Garford Mute (Total Life Society, 2017)
Hinge (Total Life Society, 2018)
Dissing The Reduction (Total Life Society, 2019)

References

External links
Scarcity Of Tanks at Discogs

American artist groups and collectives
American noise rock music groups
Musical groups from Cleveland